Lombi may refer to:

Lombi language (Cameroon)
Lombi language (DRC)
Lombi, Tartu County, a village in Estonia
Pablo Lombi
Jorge Lombi